Below is a complete list of justices who have served on the Supreme Court of Appeals of West Virginia since 1863.

Court created by the 1863 West Virginia State Constitution

Court created by the 1872 West Virginia State Constitution

* appointed ----- † died in office ----- ° resigned/retired ----- ^ elected to an unexpired term

Succession by seat

See also
Supreme Court of Appeals of West Virginia

J
West Virginia